"Stuntin' Like My Daddy" is the first single from Birdman and Lil Wayne's album, Like Father, Like Son. It peaked at number twenty-one on the Billboard Hot 100 in the United States, won the 2007 BET Viewer's Choice Award, and was named the 94th best song of 2006 by Rolling Stone magazine.

The Travis Barker rock remix of this song was released on the album on October 31, 2006.

Music video
The music video has cameos from Yo Gotti, and All Star Cashville Prince.

Freestyles and remixes
Freestyles by Lil Flip, Young Jeezy, and Plies have been made. A rock remix is featured on the deluxe version of the album. "Suicideyear" also has a popular remix of this song. Chief Keef also used the same instrumental from the song for his mixtape Finally Rolling 2. The song is titled 'Stuntin Like My Mamma'

Sampling
The song was sampled by Soulja Boy on his song "Yamaha Mama" on the album iSouljaBoyTellem. It was also a featured sample on the first track of Girl Talk's Feed the Animals and has also been sampled on Lil Wayne & Nicki Minaj's "Don't Stop Won't Stop", a mixtape track from Da Drought 3.

Charts

Weekly charts

Year-end charts

Certifications

References

2006 singles
Birdman (rapper) songs
Cash Money Records singles
Lil Wayne songs
Songs written by Lil Wayne
Music videos directed by Benny Boom